Buckhorn State Park is a  Wisconsin state park southeast of Necedah. The park occupies a peninsula on Castle Rock Lake, a reservoir formed at the confluence of the Wisconsin and Yellow Rivers.

External links

Buckhorn State Park

Protected areas established in 1971
Protected areas of Juneau County, Wisconsin
State parks of Wisconsin
1971 establishments in Wisconsin